Shurestan-e Sofla (also Romanized as Shūrestān-e Soflá; also known as Shūrestān-e Pā’īn, Shūrestān Pā’āin, Shūristān Pāīn) is a village in Salehabad Rural District, Salehabad County, Razavi Khorasan Province, Iran. At the 2006 census, its population was 539, in 116 families.

References 

Populated places in   Torbat-e Jam County